Mount Ida is a city in and county seat of Montgomery County, Arkansas, United States. Founded in 1842, the city saw a silver boom in the 1880s bring early prosperity and economic development to the area.
Today, the economy is largely ranching, poultry farming, silviculture, and tourism around Lake Ouachita. It is known as the quartz crystal capital of the U.S. and is known worldwide for its quartz deposits. The population was 996 as of the 2020 census.

History
Mount Ida was incorporated on May 30, 1890.

Episode 133, entitled "What's in my Pocket?", of the popular podcast Small Town Murder, hosted by James Pietragallo and Jimmie Whisman, featured Mount Ida on August 22, 2019.

Geography

Mount Ida is located in central Montgomery County on the south bank of the South Fork of the Ouachita River. US Route 270 and Arkansas Highway 27 pass through the town. US 270 leads east  to Hot Springs and northwest  to Heavener, Oklahoma, while AR 27 leads northeast  to Danville and southwest  to Norman.

Climate
The climate in this area is characterized by hot, humid summers and generally mild to cool winters.  According to the Köppen Climate Classification system, Mount Ida has a humid subtropical climate, abbreviated "Cfa" on climate maps.

Demographics

2020 census

As of the 2020 United States census, there were 996 people, 428 households, and 273 families residing in the city.

2000 census
As of the census of 2000, there were 981 people, 412 households, and 257 families residing in the city. The racial makeup of the city was 96.53% White, 0.10% Black or African American, 1.94% Native American, 0.31% Asian, 0.10% from other races, and 1.02% from two or more races.  0.51% of the population were Hispanic or Latino of any race.

There were 412 households, out of which 22.1% had children under the age of 18 living with them, 46.8% were married couples living together, 11.9% had a female householder with no husband present, and 37.6% were non-families. 35.4% of all households were made up of individuals, and 23.3% had someone living alone who was 65 years of age or older.  The average household size was 2.15 and the average family size was 2.74.

In the city, the population was spread out, with 19.2% under the age of 18, 6.6% from 18 to 24, 18.3% from 25 to 44, 21.7% from 45 to 64, and 34.1% who were 65 years of age or older.  The median age was 50 years. For every 100 females, there were 78.0 males.  For every 100 females age 18 and over, there were 72.0 males.

The median income for a household in the city was $21,438, and the median income for a family was $30,714. Males had a median income of $25,875 versus $20,179 for females. The per capita income for the city was $13,532.  About 18.9% of families and 23.4% of the population were below the poverty line, including 29.2% of those under age 18 and 16.0% of those age 65 or over.

Parks and recreation

The Ouachita National Forest is located in Montgomery County, and is close to Mount Ida. It is the South's oldest and largest national forest, and offers scenic areas like Little Missouri Falls, and hiking and backpacking trails. Lake Ouachita, one of the largest lakes in the region, is partially situated within Montgomery County.

Notable people

 Mark Davis, professional sport fisherman of the Bass Anglers Sportsman Society; born in Mount Ida
 Lon Warneke, Major League Baseball player, Major League umpire; born in Mount Ida
Charles L. Watkins, first Parliamentarian of the United States Senate; born and raised in Mount Ida

References

External links
 
 Mount Ida Weather & Attraction Information
 Mount Ida Chamber of Commerce Portal style website, Government, Business, Library, Recreation and more
 City-Data.com Comprehensive Statistical Data and more about Mount Ida
 ePodunk: Profile for Mount Ida, Arkansas, AR

Ouachita Mountains
Cities in Montgomery County, Arkansas
Cities in Arkansas
County seats in Arkansas
Populated places established in 1890